WCNY-TV (channel 24) is a PBS member television station in Syracuse, New York, United States. Owned by The Public Broadcasting Council of Central New York, Inc. it is sister to classical music radio station WCNY-FM (91.3). The two stations share studios on West Fayette Street in Syracuse's Near Westside neighborhood and transmitter facilities in Pompey, New York.

WCNY is also seen on translator W22DO-D (channel 22), covering the Mohawk Valley (including Utica and Rome) from a transmitter on Smith Hill Road in Deerfield.

History

WCNY was established in March 1965 by the Onondaga County School Board Association under a charter by the New York State Education Department. A non-profit organization, initially known as The Educational Television Council of Central New York, Inc., was set up to manage the station. The station was originally assigned the call letters WHTV, but switched to WCNY-TV on September 23, 1965, after the station now known as WWNY-TV in Watertown gave up the call letters. It went on the air December 20, 1965.

The new station's equipment was donated by General Electric, whose plant in the nearby town of Salina manufactured broadcast equipment. General Electric also provided WCNY with its studios, located on Old Liverpool Road in the eastern end of Salina. (WCNY's entire TV and radio operations would be based there until 2013, when it moved to its current location.) WCNY initially broadcast in monochrome, using cameras used to tape The Beatles' first appearance on The Ed Sullivan Show, but switched to color in 1971.

WCNY was initially a member station of National Educational Television (NET). When NET was replaced by the Public Broadcasting Service in 1970, WCNY became a member station of PBS. Over the years, WCNY has been responsible for producing programs and specials of local interest, some of which were distributed nationally by PBS and/or other outlets. Among the programs produced by WCNY and seen nationally include Old Enough To Care, a six-part drama that was picked up by PBS and distributed to their member stations in 1982, and Pappyland, a children's television program co-produced with Craftsmen and Scribes' Creative Workshop and telecast for three years on TLC's Ready Set Learn block, in addition to various PBS member stations.

In 2007, the station discontinued its pledge drive, making it the only PBS member station to do so. According to WCNY's president and CEO, the station is "focused on truly eliminating our dependence on any state and federal funding".

Television programs produced by WCNY

Technical information

Subchannels
The station's digital signal is multiplexed:

WCNY-TV became the first television station in the Syracuse market to produce and broadcast their own programs in high definition in 2006. 

WCNY-TV operates four digital programming subchannels, which also simulcast on W22DO-D.

Analog-to-digital conversion
WCNY-TV shut down its analog signal, over UHF channel 24, on June 12, 2009, the official date in which full-power television stations in the United States transitioned from analog to digital broadcasts under federal mandate. The station's digital signal remained on its pre-transition UHF channel 25. Through the use of PSIP, digital television receivers display the station's virtual channel as its former UHF analog channel 24.

Prior to March 2013, WCNY-TV's main programming was broadcast in SD-only (480i) on subchannel 24.1, while continuous HD (1080i) programming was offered on subchannel 24.4. Create had also been cable-only until that month's channel map reorganization.

A repeater on UHF analog channel 62 had transmitted from Nedrow to reach over-the-air viewers south of Syracuse in higher elevations until the 2009 digital conversion.

Translator

References

External links

PBS member stations
Television channels and stations established in 1965
CNY-TV
1965 establishments in New York (state)